Mobile Panic is a term developed to explain mobile media and communication crisis. Young people especially are exposed to this panic and have become targets. Examples such as mobile sexting or under age app and social media use, exposes children to sexual and violent media. Phones on peoples persons at all times, raises concerns of surveillance of mobile phone and personal information. The term also refers to the issues associated with surveillance and the effects surveillance has on people. The term "Mobile Panic" was coined by Gerrod Goggin. The term separates from related Media Panic that has to deal with social concerns around media, public opinion and interest groups. Mobile Panic more deals with issues related to personal images, videos or information that is unauthorized by individuals for public viewing. Young people especially are at risk of this concern as teens share and send nude or semi nude photographs and videos to one another. Screen shooting images without persons approval sent via snapchat or other social media can be used as another example. The effects can be detrimental as examples of suicides after unwanted pictures become exposed of individuals on public humiliating media spaces.

Surveillance Media 
Phones, social media, email, and internet browsers all have examples of recording or saving personal information. Benefits of narrowed and specific advertising for business catered to customers. Rising issue and concern of the access companies have to phones, search history, and overall personal mobile media. Panic and growing concerns around surveillance of mobile media continue to spread.

Young Generations
The emphasis in research points to youth stemming back from the 1990s exposure to cell phones, social media, phone gaming, messaging, etc. Modern technology has encompassed and enhanced features of phones in order to appeal to younger users. Young and old generations have examples of mobile panic, however young generations have the current target consumer market. Exposure to sexuality or violence as a youth has been debated and discussed as to the implications later in individuals life. Questions and concerns about exposure to overload of information as a youth and the effects of potential attention deficit behavior or other mental health issues have also been raised. Further research has been expressed as lacking or underrepresented for the potential severity of the issue. "Research partnerships involving scholars of communication, technology and society, criminology, youth studies and other cognate disciplines should be more actively fostered to comprehensively explore the significance of mobile communications in the overall context of youth development, and investigate issues of boundary-testing and delinquency for youths-at-risk"(Lim, 2013).

Mass Media and Pornography
American culture specifically focuses marketing media on sexually driven content. The selling of sex that often masculinise men and subjectify woman. In all forms of media space is allowed for highly sexual content is considered and labeled "Adult". Themes of sex in media help connect similar themes in internet porn as it relates to a sexually driven society. Porn raises further questions and concerns of mobile panic as individuals have unlimited access to porn. Panic from sexual confusion and misunderstanding produced or stemming back from media and porn.

Addiction
Media growth in recent years brings to question addictions related to mobile phone use. Further research and studies around media over use or attachment to technology as a current and growing future problem.

References
 
 
 

Mobile phones